Rene Morgan La Montagne, Jr. (December 23, 1882 – ?) was an American polo player who in 1914 won the International Polo Cup.

Biography
He was born on December 23, 1882, to Rene Morgan La Montagne, Sr. (1856–1910). In 1920 he married Grace Argo Garrett.

References

1882 births
Year of death missing
American polo players
International Polo Cup